Dawn Steckley (?-2002) was a Canadian figure skater. She was part of the Oshawa Skating Club.

Biography

Career
Steckley competed in the Canadian Figure Skating Championships held in Ottawa, ON in 1953, in which she won three medals. Although still eligible to skate as a Junior she moved up to the Senior Ladies' Singles category, and finished second behind winner Barbara Gratton of the Toronto Skating Club.

With her skating partner David Lowery (also of the Oshawa Skating Club), they won first place in Junior Pairs; then moved up to Senior Pairs and finished second behind defending champions Frances Dafoe and Norris Bowden of the Toronto SC. Later that year, Steckley and Lowery represented Canada in the pairs category at the North American Skating Championships in Cleveland, Ohio and finished 4th.

In the 1954 Canadian Championships, held in Calgary, Alberta, Steckley and Lowery finished 3rd in Pairs behind Audrey Downie and Brian Power of the Connaught SC and repeat champions, Dafoe and Bowden.

Death
In the early 2000s, Steckley died of cancer.

Results
Ladies singles

Pairs with Lowery

References

Canadian female single skaters
Year of birth missing
2000s deaths